Andrea Verdina (born 9 August 1969) is an Italian former equestrian. He competed in two events at the 2000 Summer Olympics.

References

External links
 

1969 births
Living people
Italian male equestrians
Olympic equestrians of Italy
Equestrians at the 2000 Summer Olympics
People from Novara
Sportspeople from the Province of Novara